The Suzuki GSX-RR was a road racing motorcycle developed to race in the  MotoGP series. Officially introduced on 30 September 2014 as the GSV-R replacement, it was developed by Suzuki since 2012.

History

Early development (2012–2013)
Suzuki suspended its MotoGP activities at the end of 2011 season, citing the global economic crisis, but since 2012 a prototype was spotted testing in several occasions. Initially the prototype was dubbed GSV-R by the media, like its predecessor.

In 2013 it started to take part in official tests, with Randy de Puniet and Nobuatsu Aoki as development and test riders. The machine was now internally codenamed XRH-1.

First race (2014)
It began officially racing at the last event of the 2014 season, the Valencian Grand Prix at Circuit Ricardo Tormo, Valencia, Spain, ridden by Randy de Puniet as a wild-card entry, who failed to complete more than half of the race.

2015 season
 
On September 30, 2014, at the Intermot fair, Suzuki officially announced to return in the Premier class in 2015, with Aleix Espargaró and Maverick Viñales as regular riders. Also, the prototype was publicly named GSX-RR.

On March 6, 2015, prior to the beginning of the 2015 season, Suzuki unveiled its MotoGP team name as Team SUZUKI ECSTAR.

At the 2015 Indianapolis Grand Prix, the GSX-RR received a new exhaust from Akrapovič.

2016 season
On February 26, Suzuki debuted the 2016-spec GSX-RR. The team also had sponsorship from PT Suzuki Indomobil Motor, through their Satria F150 and Nyalakan Nyali brands.
 
During the off-season 3-day test in Qatar the factory team evaluated for the first time the full seamless gearbox, which until then was a major technical lack compared to the other manufacturers. Maverick Viñales and Aleix Espargaró stayed for another season with the team

In the 12th round of the season at Silverstone, Viñales started from 3rd and broke away from Valentino Rossi, Marc Márquez and Cal Crutchlow and established a lead while the others battled. Viñales took his first victory in MotoGP and the first since Moto2 Malaysia 2014. This race marked Suzuki's first victory since the 2007 French Grand Prix.

Specifications

Complete MotoGP results

Motorcycle summary

World Championship titles: 2
Riders: 1 (Joan Mir: 2020)
Teams: 1 (Team Suzuki Ecstar: 2020)

Races won: 7
2016: Viñales 1 (1 in total)
2019: Rins 2 (2 in total)
2020: Rins 1, Mir 1 (2 in total)
2022: Rins 2 (2 in total)

Podiums: 38
2016: Viñales 4 (4 in total)
2018: Iannone 4, Rins 5 (9 in total)
2019: Rins 3 (3 in total)
2020: Mir 7, Rins 4 (11 in total)
2021: Mir 6, Rins 1 (7 in total)
2022: Rins 4 (4 in total)

Poles: 1
2015: A. Espargaró 1 (1 in total)

GSX-RR results
(key) (results in bold indicate pole position; results in italics indicate fastest lap)

See also 
 KTM RC16
 Aprilia RS-GP
 Honda RC213V
 Yamaha YZR-M1
 Ducati Desmosedici

Notes

References

External links

http://www.crash.net/motogp/news/209207/1/pics-suzuki-reveals-its-gsxrr-2015-motogp-bike.html

GSX-RR
Grand Prix motorcycles
Motorcycles introduced in 2014